Let's Ryde 2Night EP is an EP by rap group Tha Dogg Pound. It was released online as an iTunes exclusive after Tha Dogg Pound's deal with Cash Money Records was postponed. The featured single "Ch-Ching" was intended for their 100 Wayz album, but was released on Let's Ryde 2Night along with several other new songs as well as a few unreleased Dogg Pound tracks that were originally recorded for Cali Iz Active.

Track listing
"Let's Ryde 2Night" 3:59
"Ch-Ching" 4:59
"Look Like U Need a Lift" (feat. B-Real & Nate Dogg) 3:59
"Cuz from tha Dogg Pound" 4:13
"Bacc on tha Rise" 3:17
"Watch Us Ryde" 4:05
"Thiz DPG" (feat. Nitti) 4:16
"What Cha Want" (feat. Busta Rhymes) 3:45
"F.Y.T." (feat. San Quinn & The Yee) 4:03
"Oooh Baby" 4:22
"Vibe wit a Pimp" [Shawty Redd Remix] (feat. Snoop Dogg) 3:31 
"Xmas Seasons" (feat. Nate Dogg & Snoop Dogg) 5:16

2008 debut EPs
Tha Dogg Pound albums
Albums produced by Daz Dillinger
Albums produced by the Alchemist (musician)
Albums produced by Shawty Redd